Abal is a surname. Notable people with this surname include:

 Diego Abal (born 1971), Argentinian football referee
 José Abal (born 1961), Spanish athlete
 Juan Manuel Abal Medina (born 1945), Argentinian politician
 Juan Manuel Abal Medina Jr. (born 1968), Argentinian politician
 Pablo Martín Abal (born 1977), Argentinian swimmer
 Sam Abal (born 1958), Papua New Guinean politician

See also
Calligonum comosum